The 2006 European Cyclo-cross Championships were held on 9 December 2006 in Huijbergen, Netherlands. Niels Albert managed to defend his title in the under 23 category, while Marianne Vos changed her gold medal of the 2005 edition into a bronze this year.

Results

Seniors

Under 23's

Juniors

Women

Medal table

UCI Cyclo-cross European Championships
UCI Cyclo-cross European Championships
UCI Cyclo-cross European Championships
UEC European Cyclo-cross Championships